Frankie may refer to:

People
Frankie (musician), indie pop musician from Los Angeles, California
Frankie Abernathy (1981–2007), American MTV Real World cast member
Frankie Adams (born 1994), Samoan New Zealand actress
Frankie Avalon (born 1940), American actor, singer and teen idol
Frankie Ballard (born 1982), American country singer-songwriter and guitarist
Frankie Boyle (born 1972), Scottish comedian
Frankie Bridge (born 1989), English singer-songwriter
Frankie Carle (1903–2001), American pianist and bandleader
Frankie Cosmos, American musician and singer-songwriter
Frankie Crosetti (1910–2002), American baseball player
Frankie Cutlass (born 1971), American hip-hop producer, DJ, and rapper 
Frankie Darro (1917–1976), American actor and stuntman
Frankie Doom, drag performer and contestant on The Boulet Brothers' Dragula (season 1)
Frankie Faison (born 1949), American actor
Frankie Ford (1939–2015), stage name of Vincent Francis Guzzo, American singer
Frankie Fredericks (born 1967), Namibian sprinter
Frankie Frisch (1898–1973), American baseball player and manager
Frankie Giorgi (born 1981), Australian kickboxer
Frankie Grande (born 1983), American producer, actor, singer, dancer, and contestant on the TV series Big Brother
Frankie Hi-NRG MC (born 1969), Italian rapper
Frankie Howerd (1917–1992), English comedian
Frankie J (born 1976), stage name of Mexican American singer Francisco Javier Bautista, Jr., formerly of Kumbia Kings
Frankie Jonas (born 2000), American actor
Frankie Kennedy (1955–1994), Irish musician
Frankie Knuckles (1955–2014), American DJ
Frankie Laine (1913–2007), American singer, songwriter and actor
Frankie Lam (born 1967), Hong Kong actor
Frankie Luvu (born 1996), American football player
Frankie Lymon (1942–1968), African-American rock and roll/rhythm and blues singer
Frankie Manning (1914–2009), American dancer
Frankie Miller (born 1949), English singer songwriter
Frankie Muniz (born 1985), American actor
Francisco Rodríguez (Venezuelan pitcher) (born 1982), Major League Baseball pitcher
Frankie Shaw (born 1986), American actress 
Frankie Thomas (1921–2006), American actor
Frankie Valli (born 1934), American pop singer
Frankie Vaughan (1928–1999), English pop singer

Fictional characters
Franky (One Piece), in the anime and manga series One Piece
Franky, a character in the Disney game Club Penguin
Franky Andrade, of Yo soy Franky, a Colombian television series
Frankie, a great white shark in the 2004 film Shark Tale
Frankie Bergstein, in Grace and Frankie, an American comedy web television series
Frankie Cheeks, in the film Final Destination 3
Frankie Del Marco, in the Netflix series Grand Army
Frankie the Dog, an anthropomorphic dachshund and a mascot of the JumpStart educational franchise 
Frankie Foster, a major recurring character in the American animated television series Foster's Home for Imaginary Friends
Frankie Gaines, of I Am Frankie, an American television series
Frankie Hathaway, in The Haunted Hathaways American television series
Frankie McCourt, in Angela’s Ashes
Frankie Osborne, in the British soap opera Hollyoaks
Frankie Pierre, in the BBC soap opera EastEnders
Frankie Raye, a Fantastic Four character and a herald of Galactus in Marvel Comics
Frankie Stein, daughter of Frankenstein in the Monster High American fashion doll franchise
Frankie the Squealer, a mafia member in the animated television series The Simpsons
Uncle Frank/Frankie, uncle of main character Kevin in the film Home Alone
Uncle Frank, main character in the film Double Impact
Frankie and Jamie, two criminal brothers in the film American Heist

Music

"Frankie" (Connie Francis song), a 1959 single
"Frankie" (Sister Sledge song), a 1985 single
"Frankie and Johnny", also known as "Frankie", or "Frankie and Albert", a traditional American popular song
"Frankie", a song by Betty Blowtorch from Are You Man Enough?
"Frankie" a song by Bruce Springsteen from Tracks

Films
Frankie, a 1939 film released as Back Door to Heaven
Frankie (2005 film), a French film starring Diane Kruger
Frankie (Italian Roulette), a 2015 short film by Francesco Mazza
Frankie (2019 film), a French film

Other uses
Frankie (TV series), a 2013 drama series from the BBC starring Eve Myles as title character Frankie Maddox
Frankie (magazine), a bi-monthly Australian magazine
Frankie, macaw mascot of American professional wrestler Koko B. Ware
Frankie, a type of Mumbai street food

Hypocorisms
English masculine given names
English feminine given names
English unisex given names